Lukáš Haraslín (born 26 May 1996) is a Slovak professional footballer who plays as a right-winger for Sparta Prague and the Slovak national team.

Club career

Parma
For two seasons Haraslín was a player of Parma's Primavera team. Over the two seasons he collected 29 league caps for the team and scored 11 goals, playing most of the matches as a winger.

He marked his debut in Primavera against Juventus on 2 November 2013. He came on as a substitute for Marco Boscolo Zemelo in the 54th minute. Parma lost the game 2–3. Just a week later Haraslín was already a part of the starting line-up for a 1–0 victory over Bologna. His season was however cut short by an injury, that stopped him from playing between January and March, leading to only 9 starts during the season. Still, by the end of the season, Haraslín managed to score his first two goals against Modena in a 5–0 win, on 12 April 2014.

In the subsequent season, Haraslín played over twice as many games (20), scoring 9 goals, particularly between November and January, when he scored in 5 of 7 games he started, tallying a total of 7 goals. This won him promotion for the senior team as he made an Italian senior side and Serie A debut on 1 February 2015 against Milan. Haraslín replaced Silvestre Varela in the 77th minute of the 1–3 loss at San Siro. In May Haraslín returned to the senior team, as he substituted Abdelkader Ghezzal, in a match against Fiorentina (0–3 loss).

Lechia Gdańsk
On 7 July 2015, Haraslín joined Lechia Gdańsk on a three-year deal, although an apparent interest was reported from numerous clubs, yet some only requested Haraslín on a loan.

Haraslín debuted for Lechia on 16 August 2015 a wild 3–3 tie against Wisła Kraków. Although he was only fielded in the second half, coming on as a substitute for Bruno Nazário, he scored just after 6 minutes on the pitch, setting the score to 2–2. The following week, Haraslín scored 2 in a 3–1 win over Górnik Łęczna. In late October Haraslín suffered an injury that kept him out of action until early December. After he returned, he played in almost all of the games, although mostly as a substitute. He completed the season with 3 goals in 20 games.

His play time increased in 2016–17 season. While he did not surpass the 3 goals from previous season, he played in 26 games. Between July and mid-August, in the first 5 rounds of Ekstraklasa, Haraslín was sidelined due to a facial injury. Until March 2017, he played mostly as a substitute, but affirmed a place in the starting line-up in the last ten matches of the season.

At the beginning of the 2017–18 season it was announced the Haraslín had extended his contract with Lechia. The new deal was a two-year one, set to expire in June 2020. During the season, however, Haraslín only made 11 appearances as cruciate ligament rupture suffered in late-July 2017, had kept him off the pitch until late-March 2018. Since turning professional, this was Haraslín's first season when he failed to score a goal.

After his worst season in Lechia, so far, Haraslín came back for the 2018–19 in the best form yet. From the start of the season he had a solid place in the starting-XI. On 25 August 2018, in an away victory over Pogoń Szczecin, in the 49th minute of the game Haraslín scored his first competitive goal for Lechia after more than a 15 months, setting the score to 1–1. Steven Vitória and Adam Chrzanowski also contributed to the 3–2 win. During this season, which was one of Lechia's most successful in recent history, Haraslín scored 4 league goals and recorded at least 8 assists. After 32 rounds, after Ekstraklasa had split into two groups - Championship and Relegation, Lechia remained on the first place of the league table, while tied on points with Legia Warsaw. However, on matchday 33, on 27 April 2019, Lechia lost a home game at Stadion Energa Gdańsk again Legia 1–3 despite Haraslín's opening header goal in the 17th minute, after a cross from Konrad Michalak. The loss saw Lechia drop to the second place, with only 4 matches of the season remaining. Lechia completed the season with a third place, as they were also overcome by later champions Piast Gliwice. The third place tied Lechia's previous best performance from the 1956 season.

During the season, in addition to 4 league goals, Haraslín scored his first Polish Cup goal in a second round 3–1 victory over Resovia Rzeszów, after a pass from Jarosław Kubicki. Unlike in the league, Lechia managed to triumph in this competition, beating Jagiellonia Białystok 1–0 in the final. Haraslín played the entire match at Warsaw's Stadion Narodowy. While this was Haraslín's first trophy in Poland, his fellow Slovak goalkeeper Dušan Kuciak won his 5th cup trophy this season. The victory made Lechia eligible for a 2nd qualifying round of the Europa League, with Gdańsk hosting the final of that edition.

Additionally to this success, at the end of 2018, Haraslín was named Lechia's fan-favourite and in January 2019 it was reported that Galatasaray had notable interest in Haraslín's services, yet even Inter Milan, A.S. Roma, Atalanta Bergamo and Dijon were reportedly interested. The transfer, however, was put on hold, as Lechia was in a battle for the championship. In an article published on 17 May 2019 Michał Gałęzewski notes, that Lechia appears to lack a replacement for Haraslín and while a move was expectable and comprehensible, he noted it may not happen. Rafał Sumowski from trojmiasto.pl web-portal also noted that the que of future potential employers appeared to be lacking, even in late-May, due to an injury and not-as-good performances during the spring part of the season. Haraslín started in Polish Cup final game against Jagiellonia Białystok playing most of the game as Lechia won the cup. Haraslín also played an important role during the 2018–19 season as Lechia finished third in the season, Lechia's joint highest finish in the league.

The 2019–20 season saw Lechia qualify for the 2019–20 UEFA Europa League and saw them play in the Polish SuperCup. Haraslín scored twice in the SuperCup final as Lechia beat Piast Gliwice 3–1. In the Europa League Lechia were drawn against Brøndby IF. Haraslín played in both games as Lechia lost the tie 5–3 on aggregate. Haraslín made his 100th appearance for Lechia in July 2019 against Wisła Kraków. In total Haraslín made 121 appearances for Lechia with 16 goals in all competitions.

Sassuolo
In January 2020 Haraslín went on loan to Italian side Sassuolo, with the club having an obligation to buy at the end of the loan period.

Sparta Prague
In August 2021 Haraslín went on loan to Czech side Sparta Prague, with the club having an obligation to buy at the end of the loan period.

International career
For over two years Haraslín was listed as an alternate in the national team nominations. This trend began under Ján Kozák and continued for the first two nominations under Pavel Hapal.

Haraslín's first nomination to the national team happened on 28 May 2019 when Hapal called him up for a double fixture in June - a home friendly against Jordan, to which, unusually, 29 players were called-up and a UEFA Euro 2020 qualifying fixture against Azerbaijan, played away on 11 June 2019. The squad was to be reduced to 23 players for the latter fixture. Hapal was the coach who brought Bénes into public eye in Slovakia, during the successful 2017 UEFA U-21 Euro campaign. Subsequently, the core of the U21 squad became known as Hapal's children, including Haraslín himself.

Haraslín managed to make an impressive debut against Jordan at the Štadión Antona Malatinského in Trnava on 7 June 2019. Although Miroslav Stoch played on the right wing in the first half, Hapal had fielded Haraslín for the second half, among other changes, as Slovakia was one down after a counter-attack goal by Musa Al-Taamari. Haraslín however very quickly changed the offensive dynamics for Slovakia, scoring an early equaliser in his debut match, after less than 5 minutes on the pitch, by a solo through the defensive line, which followed a pass from Ján Greguš, beating Jordanian veteran international Amer Shafi with a right foot shot. As Haraslín utilised his speed against the tiring Jordanian defenders, who had just recently completed the fasting of Ramadan, he managed to create a penalty shot opportunity for Greguš, as he was fouled by Ihsan Haddad. Greguš converted the penalty to set the score to 3–1 (Martin Chrien scored the second goal). It was however revealed in the replay that Haraslín was fouled outside of the penalty area. Haraslín collected another impressive assist less than five minutes later, as he found himself in the corner of the pitch in a one-on-one situation against Bara' Marei and he managed to cross the ball into the area, with his back to the goal. The ball had bounced in front of Róbert Boženík, but was netted by Samuel Mráz within 60 seconds of his arrival onto the pitch. Mihalík's goal later on had concluded the score at 5–1. After the match, it was consensually agreed in the media and among the fans, that Haraslín deserved the unofficial title of the man of the match in his debut. He impressed Hapal enough to guarantee him an extra spot in the reduced nomination for the Baku fixture on 11 June, as Hapal removed one less player than he had promised.

He continued to feature after Hapal's dismissal under Štefan Tarkovič and was a part of Slovak Euro 2020 squad. Following, Tarkovič's dismissal and arrival of Francesco Calzona, Haraslín was initially left out of nominations due to injury and subsequent low play-time, however, in December 2022, he was nominated for senior national team prospective players' training camp at NTC Senec as one of the experienced leading players in the squad, due to his previous unavailability in the autumn of that year. Expectedly and with praise from Calzona for his recent form, Haraslín returned ahead of two home qualifiers against Luxembourg and Bosnia and Herzegovina.

Personal life 
On 27 October 2020, Haraslín tested positive for COVID-19 amid its outbreak in Italy.

Career statistics

Club

International goals
As of match played on 10 June 2022. Scores and results list Slovakia's goal tally first.

Honours 
Lechia Gdańsk
 Polish Cup: 2018–19
 Polish SuperCup: 2019

External links
 
 Rai Sport profile

References

1996 births
Living people
Footballers from Bratislava
Slovak footballers
Slovakia under-21 international footballers
Slovakia youth international footballers
Slovakia international footballers
Slovak expatriate footballers
Association football midfielders
Parma Calcio 1913 players
Lechia Gdańsk players
U.S. Sassuolo Calcio players
Serie A players
Ekstraklasa players
UEFA Euro 2020 players
Expatriate footballers in Poland
Slovak expatriate sportspeople in Poland
Expatriate footballers in Italy
Slovak expatriate sportspeople in Italy
AC Sparta Prague players